Lupe may refer to:

People
 Lupe Aquino (born 1963), Mexican boxer
 Lupe Fiasco (born 1982), American hip hop artist
 Lupe Ontiveros (1942–2012), Mexican-American film and television actress 
 Lupe Pintor (born 1955), Mexican boxer
 Lupe Vélez (1908–1944), Mexican-American actress 
 Lupe (Arrested Development), a fictional character from the television series Arrested Development
 Lupe, a fictional character from the television series Fanboy & Chum Chum

Other uses 
 Guadalupe (disambiguation)
 Lupé, a commune in the Loire department, France
 Lupe (horse), a racehorse
 SAR-Lupe, a German military reconnaissance satellite system

See also
Lope (disambiguation)
Lopez

Spanish feminine given names